Vasile Cristea, A.A. (24 February 1906 – 17 January 2000) was a Romanian Greek Catholic hierarch. He served as Official of the Roman Curia and an Apostolic Visitator for the Romanian Greek Catholic in diaspora as well being the Titular Bishop of Lebedus.

Born in Șomoștelnic, Austria-Hungary (present-day Romania), Cristea joined an Assumptionists Fathers and was ordained as a Greek Catholic priest on 27 March 1932. He was appointed the Bishop by the Holy See on 2 July 1960. He was consecrated to the Episcopate on 8 September 1960. The principal consecrator was Bishop Giovanni Mele. Bishop Cristea retired on 10 October 1987.

He died in Rome on 17 January 2000.

References 

1906 births
2000 deaths
20th-century Eastern Catholic bishops
Romanian Greek-Catholic bishops
Assumptionists